A chirp is a signal in which the frequency increases or decreases with time.

Chirp may also refer to:

Sounds
 Bird vocalization
 Chirp (rubbing sound), or stridulation, the act of producing sound by rubbing together certain body parts
 Chirp (scratch), a type of scratch performed by turntablists

Science and technology
 CHIRP (algorithm), an algorithm used to perform a deconvolution on radio astronomy images
 Chirp (company), a UK technology company
 Chirp (phone), a walkie-talkie service on Sprint-Nextel's iDEN-phones
 ChiRP-Seq, a biological methodology to identify DNA regions or proteins that are bound to a RNA molecule of interest

Arts and entertainment
Chirp (magazine), a Canadian children's magazine
Chirp (TV series), a Canadian children's animated series
"Chirp" (Modern Family), a television episode
Chirp, a robin in the TV series Peep and the Big Wide World
 "Chirp", by C418 from Minecraft - Volume Beta, 2013

See also
 Chirping (disambiguation)